Dominik Paris (born 14 April 1989) is an Italian  alpine ski racer, who specializes in speed events of downhill and super-G. He was the world champion in super-G, as the gold medalist in 2019 at Åre, Sweden.

Racing career
Paris made his World Cup debut in December 2008 and won his first World Cup race in late December 2012 in Italy, a dead-heat tie with Hannes Reichelt in the downhill on the Pista Stelvio at Bormio. Aksel Lund Svindal was just one-hundredth of a second behind for third, and Klaus Kröll was fourth, just one hundredth behind Svindal. It was the closest top-four finish in World Cup downhill history (0.02 of a second) and the first tie in a men's downhill in nearly 35 years (January 1978). Four weeks later, Paris firmly established himself as a top downhill racer on the circuit with a win at Kitzbühel on the classic Streif course.

At the 2013 World Championships in Austria, Paris won the silver medal in the downhill, 0.46 seconds behind gold medalist Aksel Lund Svindal.

Paris gained his first victory in super-G at Kitzbühel in 2015 and placed second in the downhill the next day. Two years later in 2017, he won his second downhill on the Streif course and in 2019 he concluded a "Hahnenkamm hat trick" with his third downhill win at Kitzbühel. This third victory ties him with Pirmin Zurbriggen, Luc Alphand, and Franz Heinzer as the third most successful downhill racer at Kitzbühel; only Franz Klammer, Karl Schranz (4x), and Didier Cuche (5x) won more often - but only few of them on the entire length of the original 'Streif' run.

In the 2019 season, after double victories at both Bormio and Kvitfjell, Paris added a double victory at the World Cup finals in Soldeu, where he won his first crystal globe, in the super-G. A month earlier, he won the gold medal in the same event at the World Championships in Åre, Sweden.

Paris started the 2019–2020 season with runner-up finishes in the first two speed events at Lake Louise, Canada. On December 27–28, 2019, he won consecutive World Cup downhills in Bormio, becoming the first in history to achieve five downhill victories – four in a row – on the Stelvio course. In late January, three days after his first-ever podium on the classic Lauberhorn downhill, Paris suffered an ACL injury to his right knee during a training session, ending his season.

Through November 2022, he has 21 World Cup wins and 42 podiums.

World Cup results

Season titles
 1 title  – (1 SG)

Season standings

^

Race victories

World Championship results

Olympic results

Musical career 
Dominik Paris is the singer of the metal band Rise of Voltage, from its foundation in 2017. The other members of the band are Lukas Paris (guitar, brother of Dominik), Frank Pichler (bass) and Florian Schwienbacher (drums). The band has one full-length album, Time, published in 2018.

See also
Italian skiers who closed in top 10 in overall World Cup

References

External links

Italian Winter Sports Federation – (FISI) – alpine skiing – Dominik Paris – 
Nordica Skis – athletes – Dominik Paris
 

1989 births
Living people
Sportspeople from Merano
Italian male alpine skiers
Olympic alpine skiers of Italy
Alpine skiers at the 2010 Winter Olympics
Alpine skiers at the 2014 Winter Olympics
Alpine skiers at the 2018 Winter Olympics
Alpine skiers at the 2022 Winter Olympics
Germanophone Italian people
Alpine skiers of Centro Sportivo Carabinieri